Discount rate may refer to:
 Annual effective discount rate, an alternative measure of interest rates to the standard Annual Percentage Rate
 Bank rate, the rate of interest a central bank charges on its loans to commercial banks
 Discount yield, a rate used in calculating cash flows
 Fees and other charges associated with merchant accounts.
 The weight given to future consequences relative to present consequences, measured by Time preference. Relevant in considerations of Climate ethics.